The Xiling Seal Art Society is a Chinese arts organisation based in Hangzhou, Zhejiang Province, PRC. It was founded in 1904 but, with antecedents dating back to the Ming and Qing dynasties, is one of China's most important traditional stone seal engraving associations.

Alternative names 
Other possible translations include the Xiling Seal Society, Hsi-ling Seal Society, Xiling Seal Engraving Society, Xiling Seal Engraver's Society, or Xiling Epigraphy Society.

History

Pre-society history

During the Yuan dynasty the most famous seal engraver was the scholar and artist Wang Mian, who is credited with first using soft stone for seal making.

During the Ming and Qing dynasties seal engraving flourished in China, especially in the Yangtze River Delta region, where there was a continuous rich artistic tradition. There were many different schools of seal making and many independent artists specialized in seal cutting, seal script calligraphy, and the selection of seal stones.

In South China, the three major schools of seal engraving during these periods were the Hui School (whose artists mainly came from current Anhui Province), the Zhe School (whose artists mainly came from current Zhejiang Province), and the Hai School (which was mainly developed in Shanghai, and whose major artists came from current Jiangsu and Zhejiang Provinces).

The Hui School was already a mature seal engraving school as early as the Ming dynasty, especially during the Jiajing and Wanli eras. The most famous seal makers during the early phase of this school were Xiu Ning (休宁) and He Zhen, who were active in the mid–late Ming dynasty. During the Kangxi-Yongzheng-Qianlong era of the Qing dynasty the second climax of this school appeared, and the most typical representative artist during this period was Cheng Sui from She County, Anhui. In the late Qing dynasty this school had its third climax of development and influenced engravers from outside Anhui. Typical figures of this third phase were Huang Shiling (黄士陵), Yi Dachang (易大厂), Qiao Dazhuang (乔大壮), Wang Fu'an (王福庵), and Li Yisang (李尹桑).

The Zhe School (浙派) first became famous and influential during the Qianlong era of the Qing dynasty. The main founder of this school was Ding Jing (丁敬). Ding made his school the dominant seal engraving school during his time. Because Ding was a native of Xiling and active in Xiling for a long time, a society was later formally organized with its headquarters in Xiling named the Xiling Seal Society.

Ding's most accomplished students were Jiang Ren (蒋仁), Huang Yi (黄易), Xi Gang (奚冈), Chen Yuzhong (陈豫钟), Chen Hongshou (陈鸿寿), Zhao Zhishen (赵之琛), and Qian Song (钱松), who are now widely regarded as the Eight Masters of Xiling.

The Hai School or Shanghai School of seal arts is the most recent school and mainly started developing during the late Qing dynasty. This school in fact combined different styles of previous schools, especially those artistic elements of the Hui and Zhe Schools. It's mainly considered as a modern school of seal art. Early important artists from this school are Qian Shoutie (钱瘦铁), Wu Hufan (吴湖帆), Huang Baoyue (黄葆戉), Bai Jiao (白蕉), Ma Gongyu (马公愚), Qin Bomo (秦伯未), Hua Ji'an (华笃安), Zhu Hongda (朱鸿达), Wu Zhongjiong (吴仲坰); Tang Linze (汤临泽), Chen Zili (陈子彝), Qin Kangxiang (秦康祥), Wu Youqian (吴幼潜), Jin Tiezhi (金铁芝), Zhi Ci'an (支慈庵), Lai Chusheng (来楚生), Hou Fuchang (侯福昌), and Gao Luoyuan (高络园).

Establishment of the society
Before the establishment of the society there were many local or small-sized organizations or artists groups existing, especially in Zhejiang and Shanghai, however, it was not formally registered nor recognized by the government (nonofficial). The seal artists from different schools and places first founded the Xiling Seal Society as a large/national and academic society of learning, research, and art in 1904. The first board of directors included Ding Ren (丁仁), Wang Shi (王禔), Wu Yin (吴隐), and Ye Ming (叶铭). The first President of the society was Wu Changshuo (吴昌硕), a famous scholar, calligraphist, painter, seal maker, and writer from the Hai School.

List of presidents
 Wu Changshuo (吴昌硕)
 Ma Heng (马衡)
 Zhang Zongxiang (张宗祥)
 Sha Menghai (沙孟海)
 Zhao Puchu (赵朴初)
 Qi Gong (启功)
 Rao Zongyi (饶宗颐)

Current situation
The headquarters of the society are located on the western side of Gushan Hill (孤山) in Hangzhou, Zhejiang Province. Gushan Hill is an island in the north of West Lake. From the top of the hill people can get a very nice view of the lake and enjoy its beautiful landscapes. To the northeast of Gushan is the famous Bai Causeway (白堤) named after Bai Juyi, a famous poet and governor of Hangzhou. To the west is the Xiling Bridge.

The society has several museums of seals and seal-related arts on the mountain. It also owns many old buildings mainly built during the Ming and Qing dynasties. There is also a pool and several caves on the mountain.

Every year artists get together there to discuss art. The artists are mainly from Japan, China, South Korea, Hong Kong, Taiwan, and Singapore. There are also many exhibitions and activities on the mountain annually. The famous China Academy of Art is also not far from the site of the society. The Zhongshan Park of Hangzhou is quite nearby.

The society and its facilities are now listed as one of the Major Sites Protected at the National Level of China.

See also
 Epigraphy
 Seal (East Asia)
 Seal carving
 Seal script
 Seal sculpture

References

External links 

 Official website of Xiling Society
 The Xiling Seal Engraver's Society
 Xiling Seal Engravers' Society
 Hangzhou Xiling Yinshe Introduction 

 

Chinese seal art
Chinese art
Research institutes in China
Art schools in China
Tourist attractions in Hangzhou
Art societies
Major National Historical and Cultural Sites in Zhejiang
1904 establishments in China